Stephen Donald Rope (February 2, 1929 – July 28, 2009) was a Canadian ice hockey player who competed in the 1956 Winter Olympics and 1960 Winter Olympics.

Rope was a member of the Kitchener-Waterloo Dutchmen who won the bronze medal for Canada in ice hockey at the 1956 Winter Olympics and the silver medal for Canada in ice hockey at the 1960 Winter Olympics.

Rope was a valuable member of his community in Galt (later Cambridge), Ontario, Canada.  He was the head of the boys' physical education department at Glenview Park Secondary School for more than three decades.  He helped establish the city's minor hockey program, a tennis club, and hiking trails.  After his death in 2009, admirers erected a stone monument in Cambridge's Churchill Park in Rope's honour.  It stands adjacent to Duncan McIntosh Arena.  It describes him as "an Olympian on the ice...an inspiration in the community."

References

External links

 Donald Rope's profile at Sports Reference.com

1929 births
2009 deaths
Canadian ice hockey defencemen
Ice hockey players at the 1956 Winter Olympics
Ice hockey players at the 1960 Winter Olympics
Medalists at the 1956 Winter Olympics
Medalists at the 1960 Winter Olympics
Olympic bronze medalists for Canada
Olympic ice hockey players of Canada
Olympic medalists in ice hockey
Olympic silver medalists for Canada